Grimsthorpe Lake is a lake in the Moira River and Lake Ontario drainage basins that straddles the border between Tweed, Hastings County and Addington Highlands, Lennox and Addington County in Ontario, Canada.

The primary inflow is Partridge Creek from the northwest, and there are three unnamed creek secondary inflows at the southwest, north and south. Partridge Creek is also the primary outflow at the southeast. It flows via the Skootamatta River and Moira River into the Bay of Quinte on Lake Ontario at Belleville.

See also
List of lakes in Ontario

References

Lakes of Hastings County
Lakes of Lennox and Addington County